Jaroslav Navrátil (born 1 July 1943) is a Czech former sports shooter. He competed in the 50 metre rifle three positions event at the 1968 Summer Olympics.

References

1943 births
Living people
Czech male sport shooters
Olympic shooters of Czechoslovakia
Shooters at the 1968 Summer Olympics
Sportspeople from Přerov